Coeliades anchises, the one-pip policeman, is a butterfly of the family Hesperiidae. It is found in eastern KwaZulu-Natal, Zimbabwe, Tanzania, from Mozambique to Somalia, and in Ethiopia.

The wingspan is 55–70 mm for males and 65–72 mm for females. Adults are on the wing from October to March in southern Africa.

The larvae feed on Triaspis glaucophylla, Dregea angolensis, Marsdenia angolensis, Acridocarpus, Tristellateia and Ficus species.

Subspecies
Coeliades anchises anchises
Range: Ethiopia, Somalia, Uganda, Kenya, Tanzania, Mozambique, eastern Zimbabwe, South Africa and Yemen
The giant skipper Coeliades anchises jucunda (Butler, 1881)
Range: Oman, Socotra (Yemen), United Arab Emirates

References

Butterflies described in 1871
Coeliadinae
Butterflies of Africa
Taxa named by Carl Eduard Adolph Gerstaecker